Corozal is a corregimiento in Las Palmas District, Veraguas Province, Panama with a population of 920 as of 2010. Its population as of 1990 was 1,072; its population as of 2000 was 1,034.

References

Corregimientos of Veraguas Province